The New Zealand cricket team toured Australia in December 2016 to play three One Day Internationals (ODIs) matches. The matches were played for the Chappell–Hadlee Trophy.

The series ended with a 3–0 victory to Australia. It was just the second time New Zealand had suffered a whitewash to Australia, the first being in New Zealand in 2005.

Squads

ODI series

1st ODI

2nd ODI

3rd ODI

References

External links
 Series home at ESPN Cricinfo

2016 in Australian cricket
2016 in New Zealand cricket
International cricket competitions in 2016–17
New Zealand cricket tours of Australia
2016–17 Australian cricket season